Minuscule 487 (in the Gregory-Aland numbering), ε 363 (in the Soden numbering), is a Greek minuscule manuscript of the New Testament, on parchment. Palaeographically it has been assigned to the 11th century. 
Scrivener labeled it by number 516 on his list.
Gregory labeled it twice as 487 and by another number 1321. The manuscript has complex contents.

Description 
The codex contains a complete text of the four Gospels on 218 parchment leaves. The text is written in one column per page, 18 lines per page (size of text ).

It has errors of itacism and N ephelkystikon.

Text 
The Greek text of the codex is a mixture of text-types with predominant the Byzantine element. Aland did not place it in any Category.
It was not examined by Claremont Profile Method.

History 
The manuscript once belonged to the collection of J. D. Carlyle († 1804), then to the Lambeth Palace (1255, No. 25). G. Bennet made a collation of Matthew and Mark it is held in the Lambeth Palace (1255, No. 25). In 1817 it returned to the Patriarch of Jerusalem.

The manuscript was added to the list of New Testament manuscripts by Scrivener, who it examined and collated. Scrivener published its text in 1852.

It is currently housed at the Library of Patriarch (49) in Jerusalem.

See also 

 List of New Testament minuscules
 Biblical manuscript
 Textual criticism

References

Further reading 
  (as u)

Greek New Testament minuscules
11th-century biblical manuscripts